Theodora Tzimou (born 20 March 1974) is a Greek actress. She appeared in more than twenty films since 1994.

Selected filmography

References

External links 

1974 births
Living people
Greek film actresses